Castello Cavalcanti is a short film written and directed by Wes Anderson, released in 2013, and starring Jason Schwartzman as an unsuccessful race car driver who crashes his car in an Italian village. The 8-minute film was filmed at Cinecittà in Rome, Italy and financed by Prada. It debuted at the Rome Film Festival  and was released online on November 13, 2013. It quickly became popular and received critical acclaim.

Plot
In a quiet Italian village in 1955, Italian-American Formula One driver Jed Cavalcanti (Jason Schwartzman), who is struggling in last place in a race through the countryside, crashes his car in the middle of the public square. Irritated with his situation, he abandons his car, blames the malfunctions on his brother-in-law (who is also his mechanic), and waits for the next bus out of town, which is set to arrive in 20 minutes. However, after sharing a drink with the villagers, he discovers that he is in his ancestral homeland, "Castello Cavalcanti", and that several members of his company are his "ancestors". After a friendly phone call with his brother-in-law, he soon decides to skip the next bus and spend more time in town.

Allusions to Italian cinema
Anderson alludes to some classic Italian films in the short, including several by Federico Fellini, such as La Dolce Vita (1960) and Amarcord (1973).

References

External links
 
 

2013 films
Films set in 1955
Films set in Italy
Films directed by Wes Anderson
Films shot at Cinecittà Studios
2013 drama films
Films with screenplays by Wes Anderson
2013 short films
Italian short films
American short films
2010s English-language films